Jean-Marc Chabloz (born 27 May 1967) is a Swiss biathlete. He competed at the 1992, 1994, 1998 and the 2002 Winter Olympics. In 2020, he was coaching Stina Nilsson.

Since May 2020, he has worked as the shooting coach of the Swedish biathlon team alongside Johan Hagström.

References

External links
 

1967 births
Living people
Swiss male biathletes
Olympic biathletes of Switzerland
Biathletes at the 1992 Winter Olympics
Biathletes at the 1994 Winter Olympics
Biathletes at the 1998 Winter Olympics
Biathletes at the 2002 Winter Olympics
People from Montreux
Sportspeople from the canton of Vaud